The National Research and Innovation Agency (BRIN) is a cabinet-level government agency formed by the Indonesian government in 2019. Originally a new agency attached to the Ministry of Research and Technology and leading to the formation of the Ministry of Research and Technology/National Research and Innovation Agency, the agency was controversially separated and established as a new non-ministerial government agency directly under the President of Indonesia on 28 April 2021. On 24 August 2021 the agency gained official cabinet level status through enactment of Presidential Decree No. 78/2021. Under the new presidential regulation, the agency became the sole national research agency of Indonesia.

The agency has been characterized as a "scientific merger company" for its controversial strategy of fusing many pre-existing scientific agencies into its own body. Asvi Warman Adam [id], an Indonesian scholar and historian, noted that BRIN is a form of "holding research institution". Laksana Tri Handoko, claimed that the agency he currently lead is a "Research Mothership" housing all state research activities of Indonesia.

In September 2021, BRIN became a member of the International Science Council.

History

Formation 
On 17 April 2018, Presidential Decree No. 38/2018 on National Research Main Framework of 2017–2045 was signed by President Joko Widodo. The decree is intended to provide the Main Framework outlining the national research policies and priorities for comprehensive sustainable development.

Before BRIN existed, government research and development activities were scattered across various ministries and government institutes and were mostly pursuing short term outcomes. Not only that, research and development management was considered far from effective. The Corruption Eradication Commission reported in 2018, that from the national government research funding around 24.92 trillion rupiahs allocated for research (0.25% of Indonesia Bruto domestic product), in which only 43.74% spent on Research and Development (RnD) activities, while others spent for operational costs (30.68%), service costs (13.17%), capital expenditure (6.65%), and education and training (5.77%). Not only that, fictitious research, overlapping research, and various misuse and mismanagement of funding was also reported. BRIN formed with intention to fix the problems in Indonesia research ecosystem.

BRIN formation was not apart from the figure of Megawati Soekarnoputri, former fifth President of Indonesia and Leader of Indonesian Democratic Party of Struggle. The BRIN formation was suggested by her during her political speech during 46th anniversary party event in January 2019. In her speech, she suggested to the current sitting president, Joko Widodo, to form of a national-centered research and innovation agency to direct and support national research ecosystem, promoting nationality, and promoting national self-sufficiency.

On 13 August 2019, Widodo signed Law No. 11 of 2019 on National System of Sciences and Technology. Article 48 of the law laying foundation of future BRIN. After winning the election, on 23 October 2019, he signed Presidential Decision No. 113/P/2019 on formation of his cabinet and the ministers. As the Presidential Decision written, the agency attached to Ministry of Research and Technology. On 24 October 2019, BRIN temporary constituting document, Presidential Decree No. 74/2019 signed by him. The constituting document specify that the organizational system of BRIN must be fixed in three months after the signing of the temporary document.

Uncertainty 
However, Bambang Brodjonegoro, the Minister of Research and Technology somehow failed tofinish it and meet the deadline. In response, Joko Widodo issued a temporary extension through Presidential Decree No. 95/2019 on 31 December 2019, enabling the process to be extended until 31 April 2020. However, until the time past, the process was still not finished. The situation made Indonesian researchers worried that something went wrong.

The uncertainty problem arose due to conflicts between the three ministries: Ministry of Research and Technology, Ministry of Law and Human Rights, and Ministry of State Apparatus Utilization and Bureaucratic Reform. People's Representative Council requested Joko Widodo to warn the ministries to work properly and consolidating.

In an interview on 11 April 2021, Bambang Brodjonegoro accused that there is a "political power" in government that attempted to make BRIN an autonomous body.

Separation 
On 30 March 2021, Joko Widodo submitted a Presidential Letter No. R-14/Pres/03/2021 to the People's Representative Council (DPR) contained a proposal for major change his cabinet. In his Presidential Letter, Ministry of Research and Technology and Ministry of Education and Culture will be fused into one ministry named Ministry of Education, Culture, Research and Technology. While a new ministry, Ministry of Investment, will be spin off from current Coordinating Ministry for Maritime and Investments Affairs to be independent ministry on its own, but still under its coordination. BRIN will be separated as a new non-ministerial agency.

On 9 April 2021, DPR approved the changes. On 13 April 2021, Ali Mochtar Ngabalin, a senior staff at the Executive Office of the President of the Republic of Indonesia, announced that the second reshuffle will take place on second week of April 2021. However, due to many reasons, the second reshuffle finally announced on 28 April 2021. Unusual for reshuffle happened in Indonesia, this reshuffle was the first of its kind which not only reshuffled the ministers, but also disbanding ministry institutions during the mid-term of presidency. In this reshuffle, Laksana Tri Handoko, former Chief of Indonesian Institute of Sciences appointed as the second holder of Chairman of BRIN, but first holder of chairman since its independence. All appointed officials inaugurated and their respective new offices were established with Presidential Decision No. 72/P/2021. However, the chairman inaugurated separately with different Presidential Decision, No. 19/M/2021.

Establishment as Indonesia' Sole National Research Agency 
On 5 May 2021, Joko Widodo signed Presidential Decree No. 33/2021, effectively establishing BRIN as sole national research agency. The decree decreed that all Indonesian national research agency such as Indonesian Institute of Sciences (LIPI), Agency for the Assessment and Application of Technology (BPPT), National Nuclear Energy Agency of Indonesia (BATAN), and National Institute of Aeronautics and Space (LAPAN) fused into BRIN. As expected, BRIN position no longer as regulatory body, as its regulation function remains in the ministry. Despite being signed on that day, the decree, which backdated on 28 April 2021, was not yet published on government's law official channel, Documentation Legal Information Network but mass media, which make it not yet become officially in force. It finally published on 29 May 2021.

The initial organizational structure of BRIN also greatly expanded with this decree. BRIN now divided into 2 parts, Steering Committee and Executives. The Steering Committee, which is, controversially, ex-officio office holds by members of Steering Committee of Pancasila Ideology Development Agency (abbreviated as BPIP) Steering Committee. The Chairman of BRIN Steering Committee is also the chairman of BPIP Steering Committee. The Executives headed with Chairman of BRIN, executing research and day-to-day activities, as directed by the Steering Committee.

The decree also granted local government in each province and city to upgrade their Research and Development Department in their respective province and city into Regional Research and Innovation Agency (abbreviated as BRIDA). While the BRIDA office responsible to their own respective area and local government, BRIN also have power to monitor, control, and evaluate each BRIDA office research performance. The decree mandated to every province and regencies and townships government must form their own BRIDA office in 2 years after the decree become effective. With currently there are 34 provinces, 416 regencies, and 98 townships in Indonesia, 548 BRIDA offices are expected to be formed at least until 2023.

As the initial capital for BRIN as independent agency, Government approved to allocate Rp 6.6 trillion for Fiscal Year 2022. The initial capital later finally expanded to Rp 10.51 trillion for Fiscal Year 2022 on 27 September 2021.

On 20 September 2021, it is revealed that more than 11,000 employees of the former Ministry of Research and Technology, LIPI, BPPT, LAPAN, and BATAN being moved from their original institutions to BRIN in the transitional period.

BRIN's Research and Development Consolidation Plans 
On 9 June 2021, Chairman of BRIN, Laksana Tri Handoko announced the plan that BRIN will be expanded more with integration of ministerial Research and Development divisions. The plan actually not something new, as the issue already exist in 2018, since the Bill of the Law of National System of Sciences and Technology discussed in the parliament. Back in April 2021, Joko Widodo intended that in the future, ministerial Research and Development divisions relinquished to the BRIN so the national research activities consolidated to BRIN only and no more overlapping research performed. In the announcement of this plan, BRIN, together with Ministry of Finance, and Ministry of National Development Planning, prepared 3 options: (1) full integration of those research and development division from the respective ministry to BRIN, so each ministry required to relinquished their research and development division to the BRIN fully, but this plan is the most exhaustive, because structural change may involve the research and development division's originator ministry and Ministry of State Apparatus Utilization and Bureaucratic Reform (2) program transition, which only relinquish some of ministerial research programs, its funding and execution to BRIN, or (3) partial transition, in which, only part of the research arm within the ministerial research and development division relinquished to BRIN, but the human resources retained their status from its originating ministry. The third option probably made due to, in some ministries, its research and development division combined with human resources development, such as in Ministry of Religious Affairs' Research, Development, Education, and Training Agency.

To strengthen BRIN existence to coordinate all research matters in national levels to the regional/local levels, Ministry of State Apparatus Utilization and Bureaucratic Reform issued Circular No. B/295/M.SM.02.03/2021 on reformation and transformation of research resources on 22 July 2021. The circular addressed to all state-owned research institutions and regional/local research and development departments. The circular mandated to the addressed institutes to be arranged their research and development arm under coordination of BRIN, and pushing formation of BRIDA offices as late as 31 December 2022. On 12 August 2021, the Ministry of Home Affairs' Research and Development Agency, cooperated with Ministry of State Apparatus Utilization and Bureaucratic Reform, BRIN, National Civil Service Agency, and National Institute of Public Administration held symposium on Research Institution Reformation. On the symposium, many issues relating research coordination under BRIN discussed. Addressed issues are: (1) human resource transfer from the institutions that due to be fused into BRIN, and (2) on the difficulties of BRIDA formation. On the BRIDA formation matter, the Ministry of Home Affairs offered the assistance to the local and regional government to assist the formation of BRIDA office on their respective area.

On 28 August 2021, BRIN, announced plan to cut off and dismantle redundant state research institutions and centers of excellence (COEs) in Indonesia for efficiency in funding. BRIN also developed means to prevent formation and replication of these institutions in future, so in future, formations of the institutions prohibited and avoided research redundancies deemed wasteful and burdening taxpayers' money.

On 22 September 2021, Eijkman Institute for Molecular Biology, a long-time subordinate of Ministry of Research and Technology, officially become the subordinate of the BRIN rather the Ministry of Education, Culture, Research, and Technology. It is announced that the status become "research unit under the BRIN". The name of Eijkman Institute later changed to Eijkman Molecular Biology Research Center, under the Life Sciences Research Organization of National Research and Innovation Agency. This was first BRIN organization capture after the consolidation.

On 24 January 2022, BRIN announced that finally 919 state research units from 74 ministries and non-ministerial research arms will be consolidated under BRIN umbrella. These units will be consolidated to 104 research centers scattered across 18 Research Organizations of BRIN. 12 Research organizations will be inaugurated on 1 February 2022 for first batch of 2022 consolidation.

Attempt to challenge BRIN status 
Two researchers, Eko Noer Kristianto and Heru Susetyo, submitted a judicial review to Constitutional Court to challenge the government decision. The researchers claimed that there is "potentially raised uncertainties" of Indonesia scientific community due to BRIN existence and requesting clearance on "integration" in laws regulating sciences in Indonesia. The submission of the case submitted as Submission Deed No. 34/PUU/PAN.MK/AP3/08/2021 to the Constitutional Court. The deed later registered as Case No. 46/PUU-XIX/2021 on 7 September 2021. The first meeting of the review was held on 21 September 2021. On 15 December 2021, the Constitutional Court decided to dismiss the case.

Structural Revision 
Presidential Decree No. 33/2021 proved clashed with existing laws and call for revision of the constituting document are voiced by scientists and lawmakers. The biggest issues are clashes between Law No. 10/1997 (Nuclear Power) and Law No. 21/2013 (Law of Space) in which BATAN and LAPAN, respectively made based on the said laws, not thru Presidential Decrees like LIPI, BPPT, and other agencies. On 7 July 2021, Government announced future replacement of current BRIN temporary constituting document, Presidential Decree No. 33/2021.The replacement document intended to change the way BRIN will be operated, and changing the organization's structure. The replacement document still under construction during the time of announcement. The announcement also giving some glimpses of future BRIN will be. On the announcement, there are 5 major points of revisions: (1) Revisions on the presidential decree's articles which conflicted with preexisting laws, (2) Clarification on the integration mechanisms, (3) Harmonization between BRIN and other scientific and scientific regulatory agencies, (4) Fixing inter agencies coordination issues, (5) There will be 10 to 11 Technical Implementing Organizations under BRIN. What are the Technical Implementing Organizations subordinated under BRIN were unknown at that time, but there are some demotions of currently preexisting organizations, and some others are split of preexisting organizations. The revision also somehow defending BATAN and LAPAN status for being dismantled and left out from BRIN, although however, some parts of the institutions will join BRIN. Despite that, the said revision plan yet to cover the clear difference between BRIN and Ministry of Education, Culture, Research and Technology in regulating science in Indonesia and the coordination between these two institutions on research matters with the DPR are yet to be clear. As the result, currently for consultation on research matters split between two different commissions in DPR.

As part of the bargain and deal made by preexisting agencies with BRIN, agencies fused into BRIN still able to carry their old name when they do their business as the name already used for decades and some active projects, contracts, and cooperations still retained the old name. For example, in case of LAPAN after its disbandment it will be changed into an organization called Aeronautics and Space Research Organization (ORPA). Despite LAPAN now known as ORPA, ORPA can still use LAPAN as their name on their preexisting active projects, contracts, and cooperations.

On 30 July 2021, Joko Widodo issued Presidential Decree No. 62/2021, the permanent constituting document of Ministry of Education, Culture, Research and Technology, to the government's law official channel, Documentation Legal Information Network. The decree further cemented the ministry regulatory functions over science, research, and technology in Indonesia thru formation of the General Directorate of Higher Education, Research, and Technology, miniaturized version of Ministry of Research and Technology, within the ministry body, not BRIN. While it make clear that BRIN do not have regulatory functions anymore and vested the regulatory functions in the ministry, the document still not yet made clear the coordination between the ministry and the BRIN. Nadiem Makarim himself asserted that BRIN is a partner of the ministry in performing research, not the subordinate of the ministry.

On 10 August 2021, as part of leaving the past and legacy of Ristek era, BRIN introduced new logo. The change of the logo announced at the same time of 26th National Technology Awakening Day celebration. The logo was drawn by Triawan Munaf [id], former Chief of Creative Economy Agency of Jokowi's previous Working Cabinet. The new logo consisted with stylized, integration of previous logos of LIPI, BPPT, LAPAN, and BATAN. At the ceremony, Laksana Tri Handoko announced the finalization of upcoming draft of BRIN lineup.

On 24 August 2021, the new BRIN temporary constitutional document, Presidential Decree No. 78/2021 signed as the replacement of Presidential Decree No. 33/2021 and published on 1 September 2021. Based on the new decree, BRIN Steering Committee and deputies overhauled and restructured, the Technical Implementing Organizations (now termed simply as Research Organizations) in BRIN expanded, and integration mechanism cleared. The new decree did not spare BATAN and LAPAN from disbandment, however, BATAN and LAPAN relinquished their power and rights granted by laws, Law No. 10/1997 (Nuclear Power) and Law No. 21/2013 (Law of Space) respectively, to the BRIN as sole inheritor. It also provide mechanisms to local and regional government to form BRIDA offices. In the old constituting document, BRIDA is solely formed by their respective local and regional government. In the new constituting document, BRIDA formation is jointly provided by local/regional government and BRIN, with BRIN providing consideration of the formation of BRIDA to the local government. The BRIDAs can be attached to the Local/Regional Government Research and Development Department, not too burdening to local/regional government as before. It also make clear between BRIN and the Ministry of Education, Culture, Research, and Technology. BRIN inherited much of the former Ministry of Research and Technology, except some works and responsibilities that need to left to the Ministry of Education, Culture, Research, and Technology. The decree also reconfigure the office of the Steering Committee, from solely from BPIP steering committee members to become mixed between BPIP, Ministry of Finance, and Ministry of National Development Planning, academicians, and professionals. The decree also uplifted status of BRIN to not only behaved just like common research and development agency which just only performing researches. The decree officially turned BRIN to has power and enjoyed status like ministerial office and become cabinet-level agency (termed as ). However, BRIN activities much controlled under supervision of BRIN Steering Committee directions, inputs, evaluations, approvals, or policy recommendations due to increased power of BRIN Steering Committee granted by the decree. The BRIN Steering Committee also had reserved rights to form Executive Assistance Task Forces to effectively assist BRIN executive under "special circumstances" if needed. BRIN also required to report its institutional performance biannually to the Steering Committee, and annually reported to the president. On 2 September 2021, acting executive officers of the Research Organizations inaugurated. With the inauguration of officers, LIPI, BPPT, LAPAN, and BATAN come to the end, but their integration process still on the way and pushed to one year after the enactment of Presidential Decree No.78/2021.

On 3 September 2021, BRIN announced that will be held position filling process gradually in September 2021, December 2021, and March 2022 due to the organization size. The real size of BRIN was not yet known to public and yet to be disclosed. On 6 September 2021, it is revealed from the disclosure that the organization structure of BRIN is actually very big, and 16 Research Organizations planned to be placed under its umbrella.

On 13 October 2021, Megawati Soekarnoputri and other Steering Committee members inaugurated as BRIN Steering Committee by Joko Widodo. The inauguration done after a period of controversy over the Office of the BRIN Steering Committee brewed since May 2021. On the ceremony, Megawati inaugurated together with Sri Mulyani, Suharso Monoarfa, Sudhamek Agung Waspodo Sunyoto, Emil Salim, I Gede Wenten, Bambang Kesowo, Adi Utarini, Marsudi Wahyu Kisworo, Tri Mumpuni.

Liquidation of State Research and Development Agencies into BRIN 
In attempt of consolidation of state research activities under BRIN, Indonesian Government changed several ministries affected with the reform. Some ministries, which do not want to their R&D institutions being liquidated into BRIN due to being vital for decision making were opted to rescale their R&D operation, while also contributing part of their unit and resources to be relinquished to BRIN. Most ministries are no longer perform national scale or large-scale research, except for policy making purposes. The reform also changed BRIN to able to perform national or large scale research, no longer the ministry.

Some exception of the transfer also happened. For example, was Ministry of Communication and Information Technology Human Resources Research and Development Agency due to the agency very specialized research in communication monitoring and policy making and does not contain any research which falls into innovative research. Moreover the agency focuses largely on education and training purposes. On 24 November 2021 the agency only relinquished 30 researchers, 2 research programs, and its funding to BRIN to be positioned in BRIN preexisting research agencies.

BRIN research scope however not without limitation. In January 2022, BRIN decided only focused in research on civilian affairs for flexibility and easiness to get partner in research collaborations. Research in military affairs and defense and security affairs decided to be left out due to critical position and national security interests and reasons. As the result only Defense Research and Development Agency of the Ministry of Defense that left out from the integration of ministerial research and development agencies into BRIN, despite part of the researchers transferred into BRIN. The decision also left research and development agencies under Indonesian National Armed Forces to not to be integrated. The decision also led into various units and researches formerly owned by LAPAN and BPPT which focused in military research and defense and security affairs being left out and relinquished to Ministry of Defense. There was a proposed plan to form Defense Acquisition Institute, a military counterpart of BRIN, which intended to integrate all military research and development agencies in response of the decision. On 2 March 2022, Ministry of Defense and BRIN signed the MoU for research collaboration to bridge and closing the gap between military and civilian researchers. On 17 June 2022, Defense Research and Development Agency replaced with Agency for Defense Policy and Technology Development.

Research and Development Center of Indonesian National Police also not to be liquidated. On 11 January 2022, the National Police renewed the research collaboration MoU with BRIN as most of its research partner liquidated before.

Preceding Agencies 
BRIN, as sole Indonesia's National Research Agency, projected as sole inheritor and continuation of various Indonesia's state research agencies. This list is list of BRIN predecessors.

Logo

Organizations 
With the structural revision thru Presidential Decree No. 78/2021, the decree overhauled the structure of BRIN and expanded BRIN structure. The decree altered BRIN Steering Committee structures and Research Organizations of BRIN from original 4 into 7, less than 11 originally planned. The Deputies structures also altered to not based on the fields of expertise as before. On 6 September 2021, full structure of BRIN disclosed. The disclosure cited Presidential Decree No. 78/2021 and Chairman of BRIN Decree No. 1/2021. From the disclosure, it is revealed that those 7 Research Organizations actually part of more than dozens Research Organizations that will be placed under BRIN.

On 24 September 2021, Chairman of BRIN Regulation No. 1/2021 fully published. The regulation outlined the executive offices and deputies under BRIN.

The number of research organizations formed by BRIN are still fluid and seems always changing, although it was said it will be "on range of dozens". It is revealed by the Chairman of BRIN Regulation No. 4/2021 granted the power to the Office of the Chairman of BRIN itself to form Research Organizations as the chairman deems needed and its formation can be approved with approval of the Ministry of State Apparatus Utilization and Bureaucratic Reform. It is announced on 24 January 2022 that 12 approved research organizations from the planned 18 BRIN research organizations will be finalized on 1 February 2022.

The full structure of BRIN is as follows:

 Office of BRIN Steering Committee
Office of Chairman of BRIN Steering Committee (ex-officio office filled with the BPIP Chairman of Steering Committee)
Office of Vice Chairmen of BRIN Steering Committee (ex-officio office filled with the Minister of Finance and Ministry of National Development Planning)
Secretary
Steering Committees
Executive Assistance Task Forces
 Executives
 Office of Chairman of BRIN
 Office of Vice Chairman of BRIN
 Executive Secretariat
Bureau of Planning and Finance
Bureau of Law Affairs and Cooperation
Bureau of Organization Affairs and Human Resources
Bureau of State Properties Management Affairs and Procurement
Bureau of Public Communication, General Affairs, and Secretariat
 Deputy I (Development Policy)
Office of the Deputy I
Deputy Secretary for Development Policy
Directorate of Human Development, Population and Cultural Policy
Directorate of Political, Legal, Defense, and Security Policy 
Directorate of Economy, Manpower, and Regional Development Policy
Directorate of Environment, Maritime, Natural Resource, and Nuclear Power Policy
 Deputy II (Research and Innovation Policy)
Office of the Deputy II
Deputy Secretary for Research and Innovation Policy
Directorate of Policy Formulation for Research, Technology, and Innovation
Directorate of Measurements and Indicators for Research, Technology, and Innovation 
Directorate of Policy Evaluation of Research, Technology, and Innovation
 Deputy III (Human Resources of Science and Technology)
Office of the Deputy III
Deputy Secretary for Human Resources of Science and Technology
Directorate of Competency Development
Directorate of Functional Position Fostering and Professional Development
Directorate of Talent Management
 Deputy IV (Research and Innovation Infrastructure)
Office of the Deputy IV
Deputy Secretary for Research and Innovation Infrastructure
Directorate of Scientific Collection Management
Directorate of Research Vessels Management
Directorate of Laboratory Management, Research Facilities, and Science and Technology Park
Directorate of Nuclear Facilities Management
Directorate of Strengthening and Partnership of Research and Innovation Infrastructure 
 Deputy V (Facilitation of Research and Innovation)
Office of the Deputy V
Deputy Secretary for Facilitation of Research and Innovation
Directorate of Management of Research Permit and Innovation, and Scientific Authorities
Directorate of Intellectual Property Management
Directorate of Repositories, Multimedia and Scientific Publishing
Directorate of Research and Innovation Funding
 Deputy VI (Utilization of Research and Innovation)
Office of the Deputy VI
Deputy Secretary of Utilization of Research and Innovation
Directorate of Technology Transfer and Audit System
Directorate of Utilization of Research and Innovation by Industries
Directorate of Utilization of Research and Innovation by Government, Society, and Micro, Small, and Medium Enterprises
Directorate of Research and Innovation Partnership
 Deputy VII (Regional Research and Innovation)
Office of the Deputy VII
Deputy Secretary of Regional Research and Innovation
Directorate of Regional Research and Innovation Policy
Directorate of Facilitation and Monitoring of Regional Research and Innovation 
Directorate of Dissemination and Utilization of Regional Research and Innovation 
 Executive Inspectorate
Office of Main Inspectorate
Division of General Affair and Reporting
Inspectorate I (Internal Supervision of Main Secretariat, Research Organizations, and Centers)
Inspectorate II (Internal Supervision of Deputy I, II, III, and VII)
Inspectorate III (Internal Supervision of Deputy IV, V, and VI)
 Research Organizations (as disclosed on 24 January 2022)
Research Organization for Earth Sciences and Maritime
Research Organization for Life Sciences and Environment
Research Organization for Agriculture and Food
Research Organization for Health
Research Organization for Archaeology, Language, and Letters
Research Organization for Social Sciences and Humanities
Research Organization for Nuclear Energy
Research Organization for Governance, Economy, and Public Welfare
Research Organization for Energy and Manufacture
Research Organization for Nanotechnology and Material
Research Organization for Electronics and Informatics
Research Organization for Aeronautics and Space
 Centers
Center of Data and Information (attached to Main Secretariat)
Center of Technology Services (attached to Main Secretariat)
Indonesian Nuclear Technology Polytechnic
 Non-structural organizations (as disclosed 23 May 2022)
Secretariat of Indonesian IAEA Technical Cooperation National Liaison Officers (TC-NLO)
Indonesian Space Agency (INASA)
Secretariat of Biodiversity Scientific Authority
Secretariat of Indonesian UNESCO Intergovernmental Hydrological Program
Secretariat of Indonesian UNESCO Management of Social Transformation Project
Secretariat of Indonesian UNESCO Man and Biosphere Project 
Secretariat of Indonesian UNESCO Intergovernmental Oceanographic Commission
BRIN Council of Professors

Aside of these offices, Local and Regional BRIDA offices coordinated, synchronized, controlled, and monitored under Deputy VII.

Responses 
BRIN formation is welcomed by many scientists, and politicians. It separation to become a fully independent agency reporting directly to the president also praised.

However, there is some fears that BRIN might become a political tool which leading to a source of potential conflict of interest. Largely, because BRIN existence is not separated from the role of Megawati and there is a rumor that Megawati wanted to be placed in BRIN "Directorial Committee". The rumor become true with the issue of Presidential Decree No. 33/2021, as establishment of Steering Committee is realized and Megawati automatically become the Chairman of the office due to being an ex-officio office.

To prevent BRIN become political tool, Indonesian Young Scientists Academy (Indonesian: , ALMI) issued three stances: (1) government must keeping science and technology as base for policy making and decision, (2) instrumentation of science and technology and preventing BRIN, science and technology institute and research centers, and universities to become state corporations which follows the governing regime's political will and capitalism market to ensure their neutrality and independence, (3) ensuring the clear BRIN role as executor, not as the regulator to prevent overlapping role with ministries, and clearing form of BRIN as either independent agency on his own, or combining the existing government research and development agencies into BRIN umbrella.

Criticisms

Potential of Conflict of Interest 
While its existence was desired by Indonesia's scientific community, formation of BRIN was criticized due to being coordinated with and sharing the same Steering Committee with BPIP. Critics are afraid that in doing so, BRIN becomes politicized and received government intervention, threatening scientific freedom from political interest. This controversy arise largely because Megawati, a member of the steering committee for BRIN, is also a political party leader. An opposition party, Prosperous Justice Party also lamented the decision, because the Steering Committee office did not have lawful basis, and was not mandated in Bill No. 11/2019. The law basis actually came from a bill, Bill of Pancasila Ideology Direction, which supposedly become the law basis for BPIP to grasp power to direct everything to the Pancasila, but the bill already dropped and died out. The party also criticized the fusion of older state scientific institutes like LIPI, LAPAN, BPPT, and BATAN, because not only erasing the historical Indonesia scientific institutions and landmarks, the fusion also clashed with existing laws primarily Law No. 10/1997 (Nuclear Power) and Law No. 21/2013 (Law of Space). The Chairman, Laksana Tri Handoko, however, supported that the "Steering Committee - Executive" system between BPIP and BRIN is necessary for building "responsible science-based policy making" to guide national research programs following national interests and protecting from irresponsible researches which may potentially conflicted with national ideology, interests, and wisdoms. The ruling party, Indonesian Democratic Party of Struggle, supported the decision, largely due to Megawati contribution to Indonesian scientific community, and as the party claimed, one of people that advocating larger scientific funding for Indonesia research agencies. Yanuar Nugroho, political scientist and research advisor of Centre for Innovation Policy and Governance think-tank based in Jakarta, commented that if the steering committee exist for organizational purpose, it is not become problem as their job just steering the organization and its policies. However, if the steering committee exist to control the direction of the growth and advancement of sciences, it may become the problem as it will be translated the attempt of the government, whoever is ruling, to monopolize the sciences to establish righteousness based on government' point of view. Because Indonesia now just have BRIN only, BRIN expected to be "right and righteous" first before fully operating.

Criticism over Liquidation Strategy 
Current BRIN status and its expansion by "eating" older existing research agencies also criticized. Azyumardi Azra, Indonesian Islam scholar lamented the decision, because such invasive merging strategy used by the agency to build his own, and the merger process itself expected to be happened in very short time. Such process is very risky and even if it is succeeded, the resulting organization become so massive and very large. The merger strategy used by BRIN also cost the National System of Sciences and Technology lined out by the Law No. 11/2019 itself, which the law mandated the independence of each the scientific organizations and co-operation, and synergy between the scientific organizations. If many scientific organizations all fused into BRIN, practically BRIN will monopolize the research performed by the state. Not only that, with the status just as research and development agency, not a ministry as before, the bargaining power of BRIN also weak. The issues resolved with the issuance of the new temporary BRIN constituting document, Presidential Decree No. 78/2021.

Criticism on BRIDA Formation 
Not only the BRIN formation, formation of BRIDA offices across Indonesia also quite difficult. Largely because local and regional research and development agency under local and regional government had been so long neglected, underpowered, underperformed, lacking the resources and instruments, lacking proper and capable human resources, and mostly their researches limited only in local and regional policy making and lack of innovation.

Controversy over Balitbangtan Liquidation 
During the hearing with Commission IV of People's Representative Council on 25 August 2021, Syahrul Yasin Limpo, Minister of Agriculture expressed his concern about the future BRIN plan of liquidation of ministerial research agencies and turning the agency to become part of BRIN. The Ministry of Agriculture's Indonesian Agency for Agricultural Research and Development (Balitbangtan) is one of ministerial research agencies targeted to be liquidated and fused into BRIN. While the agency performances largely not known at large and publicly known as other research agencies, Indonesian Agency for Agricultural Research and Development is a much larger research agencies with established networks of state agriculture research institutes responsible with state agricultural research activities with more than 707.4 million hectares under their responsibility, and possessed large manpower powering it even larger than all Indonesian Institute of Science manpower totalled. Endang S. Thohari, former Ministry of Agriculture scientist and one of founder of Balitbangtan who currently Gerindra politician sitting in Commission IV also lamented the government decision to liquidate the agency she founded with Indonesian agricultural scientists. In the hearing, Limpo asked the support to the Commission IV to spare Balitbangtan from the liquidation, or if even it liquidated only part of basic researches divisions that relinquished to BRIN, while specialized agricultural researches still performed by Balitbangtan. Earlier on 20 August 2021, Research Professor Communication Forum of Balitbangtan also voiced the same concern. Tahlim Sudaryanto, Agriculture professor and Head of Research Professor Communication Forum of Balitbangtan submitted the report compiled by the forum to the Ministry of State Apparatus Utilization and Bureaucratic Reform and Ministry of State Secretariat. In the report, the forum performed analysis and concluded that it is very hard to fused such large Balitbangtan to BRIN body in smooth without disturbance. The forum offered two options that possible: (1) soft integration, and (2) partial integration. If soft integration chosen, BRIN will lack power to control Balitbangtan, as Balitbangtan still attached to the Ministry of Agriculture but Balitbangtan programs and funding controlled and supervised by BRIN. While the option not advantaged to BRIN, the option is strengthening BRIN and Balitbangtan in collaboration to succeeding National Plan of National Research Priorities of 2020 - 2024 period. If partial integration chose, part of Balitbangtan relinquished to BRIN, and what remained with Balitbangtan will reformed into a non-research institution under Ministry of Agriculture with tasks assignments to be determined in the future. While this option advantaging BRIN, the execution of the option must be not be rushed and pushed into fixed 31 December 2022 deadline as mandated in the Circular No. B/295/M.SM.02.03/2021. The report also urged the government to change their deadline on liquidation if the second option chosen.

On 21 September 2021, Ministry of Agriculture set up plans to disband their own Balitbangtan despite previous ministry reluctance to disband it and relinquished all the units from Balitbangtan to BRIN. As replacement of Balitbangtan, the ministry set up an agency tentatively named "Agricultural Standardization and System Agency" (Indonesian: , BSSP), a regulatory and standardization agency. Along with Balitbangtan disbandment, part of the Ministry' Food Security Agency also relinquished to BRIN, while other part expected to become an embryo of another agency, National Food Agency. On 21 September 2022, Balitbangtan formally dissolved.

Continuous Political Attacks from Prosperous Justice Party 
BRIN existence unwelcomed by Indonesian Islamist groups. The Islamist groups, led by the current Islamist opposition party sitting in the parliament, Prosperous Justice Party (PKS), continuously attacked BRIN existence, largely because the party dislike towards Megawati figure and Indonesian Democratic Party of Struggle (PDI-P). Numerous political attacks, self-claimed by the party as "criticisms" had been launched by the party towards the new institution since the beginning of the separation of BRIN from the Ministry of Research and technology. The party also played Islamic themed populist narration in attempt to delegitimize BRIN existence and claimed that BRIN existence as "de-Habibie-nization project" and accused Joko Widodo administration to "remove landmarks left by Habibie and other Islamic scholars and scientists in building Indonesia research ecosystem" and favoring "secular model of scientific development" rather the "religious-based model of scientific development". In the Indonesian political history, Habibie was Islamic scholar and first president during  era and during his era Islamic puritanism and Islamic conservatism was given the "living breath" and opportunities and relationship between Habibie and Indonesian Islamists and right-wing activists was very well. For his role, Habibie was set by the PKS party was set as the party's patron back in 2016 and for PKS Habibie is "scholar and democrat".

Friction with Commission VII DPR 
BRIN criticized for its friction over their research resources and apparent inefficiency. Laksana Tri Handoko also involved with spats with Commission VII DPR resulted the Commission recommended him to be expelled from BRIN and replaced with other people which much competent person and BRIN audited by the Audit Board of Indonesia (BPK). One Commission VII DPR member, Syaikhul Islam Ali from National Awakening Party, even asked to anyone who replaced Laksana no need being a researcher, but only a manager-minded which capable to manage to be a Chairman of BRIN. However, DPR itself did not have power to doing so. Despite that, Megawati ordered Handoko to keep going and supporting his leadership. The BPK finished their audit on 31 January 2023, but the BPK report is yet to be published.

List of BRIN Core Leadership

List of Steering Committee Members

List of Chairmen

References

Science and technology in Indonesia
2019 establishments in Indonesia
2021 establishments in Indonesia
Government agencies of Indonesia
Government agencies established in 2019
Government agencies established in 2021
Members of the International Council for Science
National Research and Innovation Agency